Edward Davies (3 May 1923 – 26 March 1995) was an English footballer who played at centre-forward for Port Vale, Witton Albion, and Herne Bay.

Career
Davies joined Port Vale in January 1943, but was shortly guesting for Chelsea as Vale were in abeyance because of the war. His Vale debut finally came on 1 December 1945 in a 2–1 win at Macclesfield Town. He scored three goals in his next four games, before breaking his leg in January 1946. He recovered to play three Football League Third Division South games at The Old Recreation Ground the next season, but was transferred to Witton Albion in November 1946 by new "Valiants" boss Gordon Hodgson. He made his Witton debut on 20 November and scored two goals in his four games for the club. Later he played for Herne Bay. A prolific scorer at Herne Bay, he set the club's record for most goals in a season with 62. He was well known for his extremely hard head and ability to head the ball harder than most strikers could kick it. Davies retired in the 1959–60 season.

Career statistics
Source:

References

Sportspeople from Burslem
English footballers
Association football forwards
Port Vale F.C. players
Chelsea F.C. wartime guest players
Witton Albion F.C. players
Herne Bay F.C. players
English Football League players
1923 births
1995 deaths